Khadyjah Fofanah (born 21 June 1980 in Koidu Town, Sierra Leone) better known by her stage name Khady Black is a Sierra Leonean rastafarian and Roots reggae musician. She is Sierra Leone's first international female reggae artist. Khady Black sings mainly in English, Krio and in her native Mandinka language.

Because of her style of singing, Black is referred to as a social activist whose songs address key issues affecting Sierra Leone's youth and in particular women. Her lyrics, which poke fun of real-life situations like calling for education of youths in her "Mr. Government" song and teasing black women who get caught up in wearing skin-lightening creams in "Cosmetic Girls" is a testament of Khady Black's satirical genius. Like other Rastafarian, Khady Black is a huge fan of Jamaican international Reggae star Bob Marley. Khady Black is getting ready to release her new and nationally anticipated album called Flying with Jah Love, with her new record label Black Records.

Biography
Khadyjah Fofanah, better known as Khady Black, was born on 21 June 1980 in Koidu Town, Kono District in Eastern Sierra Leone to Muslim parents Haja Fanta Saccoh and Alhaji Mustapha Fofanah. Both of his parents are members of the Mandingo ethnic group. As the last daughter in a family of fourteen, Khady had always been the darling of the family. She is a graduate of the Koidu Girls Secondary School in Koidu Town.

In June 2005, Khady Black released her debut album Mr. Government at the National Stadium in Freetown in front of thousands of fans. The album was a huge success in Sierra Leone and internationally. In November 2005, Khady Black won the TBS Music Award held in Freetown, Sierra Leone for Best Reggae Album – Mr. Government.

In November 2005, Khady Black and her label the Supreme Inc went on tour in the United States with fellow Sierra Leonean musician Emmerson and his Borbor Bele fame crew. On the tour in US, she performed in New York City, Philadelphia, Pennsylvania, Atlanta, Georgia and in Langley Park, Maryland. She also went on tour in September 2005 in England and performed at the VIP Charity Navo's nightclub in London and at the Brixton Recreation Centre also in London. In July 2005 she had a Special performance at Le Palais and Vibrations Nightclub in Conakry, Guinea. She also performed at Joker and Calabash in Banjul, the Gambia in August 2005.

Khady Black performed with international musical artists from Africa and the Caribbean to mark the 200th Anniversary of the abolition of the transatlantic slave trade held on 27 August 2007 at the Queen's Gardens in Hull, England. The event celebrated African and Caribbean culture and featured several international artists from Africa and the caribbean.

Tour
In July 2005 Khady Black had a Special performance at Le Palais and Vibrations Nightclub in Conakry, Guinea. In August 2005 shill performed at Jokor and Calabash in Banjul, the Gambia. In September 2005 in England, Khady performed the VIP Charity Navo's nightclub in London and at the Brixton Recreation Centre also in London.  In November 2005 Khady and her label the Supreme Inc went on tour in the United States with Emmerson and his Borbor Bele fame crew. On the tour in US, she performed in New York City, Philadelphia, Pennsylvania, Atlanta, Georgia and in Hyattsville, Maryland. On May 11, 2006, Khady performed at the National Stadium in Freetown, in celebration of the 25th death anniversary of Bob Marley.

NGO Ujima Ambassador for Africa Development
Today, Khady Black feels her biography will not be complete without making mention of Ujima, an NGO that took a bold step by appointing her as the first Sierra Leonean artist ever to be named "Goodwill Ambassador."

Donation to charities
In a very short period of time, she settled in as a perfect Goodwill Ambassador, donating one million Leones to her fan club to promote micro-economics on behalf of the NGO that she had vowed to support. She again became the first female Sierra Leonean artist to visit the sad victims of her country's 10-year rebel war to offer words of comfort and donate thousands of used clothing to the wives of amputees in their amputee camps.

Khady Black resume as an artist and performer
2002 – Mandingo song recorded for PRSP a nation building effort
2003 – Produced a single to help promote the fight against HIV & AIDS effort towards nation building
February 2005 – A National performance at the Free HIV & AIDS Awareness Concert at the National Stadium Brookfields Freetown.
April 2005 – Discovered by Supreme Inc at the "Peak Men show" at the National Stadium, Brookfields, Freetown, Sierra Leone
June 2005 – Album Release party Mr. Government at the British Council followed by another one at The National Stadium, Brookfields, Sierra Leone.
July 2005 – Special performances at Le Palais and Vibrations Nightclub in Conakry, Guinea
August 2005 – Special performances at Jokor and Calabash in Banjul, the Gambia
September 2005 – VIP Charity performance at Navo's nightclub, London, England
September 2005 – Live Charity performance at the Brixton Recreation Centre, Brixton, London, England
October–November 2005 – Supreme Inc USA tour with Emmerson and V of Borbor Bele fame
19 November 2005 – Khady Black wins a TBS Music Award in Sierra Leone for "Best Reggae Album – Mr. Government.
16 December 2005 – LIVE Band performance at the Celtel Premier Music Awards. Again presented with an award for Best Reggae Artist.
January 2006 Guest and Star appearance at the NGO – Ujima for Africa Development's official launching at Silver Wings Entertainment Complex, in Freetown Sierra Leone.
11 May 2006 – Special guest appearance & performance at the Bob Marley Reggae Jam Splash; a LIVE band performance with other leading reggae artists.
17 July 2006 – Appointed as Goodwill Ambassador for an NGO; the first time ever for a Sierra Leonean artist.
August 2006 – Goodwill tour for Ujima for Africa Development
September 2006 – Special appearance at a fundraising dinner for VP Solomon Berewa – London UK

References

Sierra Leonean women singers
Reggae musicians
Living people
1980 births
People from Koidu
Sierra Leonean Mandingo people
21st-century women singers